Hartoft is a hamlet in the Ryedale district of North Yorkshire, England.

References 

Civil parishes in North Yorkshire
Ryedale